is an annual rock festival held in Naeba Ski Resort, in Niigata Prefecture, Japan. The three-day event, organized by Smash Japan, features more than 200 Japanese and international musicians, making it the largest outdoor music event in Japan. In 2005, more than 100,000 people attended the festival.

Fuji Rock Festival is named so because the first event in 1997 was held at the base of Mount Fuji. Since 1999 the festival has been held at the Naeba Ski Resort in Yuzawa, Niigata.

Festival grounds 

There are seven main stages and other minor stages scattered throughout the site. The Green stage is the main stage and it has a capacity for almost 50,000 spectators. Other stages include the White Stage, the Red Marquee, Orange Court, and Field of Heaven. The walks between some of the stages can be long, and some of the trails can be hilly, but the walks are beautiful, often taking you through forests and over sparkling streams. Dragondola – the longest gondola lift in the world, carries festival goers up to the top of the mountain overlooking the festival site.

The hub of the site is called Oasis where more than 30 food stalls from around the world gather. The main site closes each night after the final act, but Oasis continues to stay open until late at night, as well as the Red Marquee where an all-night rave continues until 5am. The site re-opens at 9am.

The night before the festival (Thursday night) features an opening party which is free entry, featuring bon-odori (traditional Japanese folk dance), prize draws, food stalls and a fireworks display.

The festival's stated aim is to be "The cleanest festival in the world"; great effort is also put into recycling.

Accommodation 
Although Naeba, being a ski resort, offers a number of accommodation options such as hotels, ryokan and minshuku within walking distance of the festival site, competition for these is fierce and they tend to book out very quickly. Many festival goers find accommodation in nearby ski resorts such as Tashiro, Asagai and Mitsumata – the free shuttle bus linking JR Echigo-Yuzawa Station (in the town of Yuzawa to the festival site can be used for these areas which are en route. Some even find accommodation in the numerous options available in Yuzawa itself. The shuttle bus takes between 40 minutes to an hour each way and runs until 2am each night.

Alternatively, there is a campsite on a golf course next to the festival site which costs  for the weekend (2011), complete with toilets, showers and food stalls. About 17,000 festival goers choose to spend their nights here every year. The campsite is hilly in many places and flat spots are taken quickly, however, the manicured putting greens, which are the flattest areas are generally out of bounds to campers.

In previous years many took the option of sleeping rough – a relatively common practise amongst young Japanese during the warmer months thanks to a low crime rate – in the vicinity of the site and Echigo-Yuzawa Station, however this is now prohibited.

Access 
JR Shinkansen ticket, Tokyo to Echigo-Yuzawa is  one way (for a reserved seat).

History 

The first year of the festival, held on Tenjinyama Ski Resort near Mt Fuji (and hence the name), was a disaster. It was scheduled to be a two-day event, but by sheer bad luck the first day of the event was struck by a typhoon. The Red Hot Chili Peppers' headline set, played through a storm despite Anthony Kiedis having a broken arm, is almost legendary amongst Fuji Rock veterans. The festival-goers were poorly prepared for the heavy rain and strong winds, and many needed medical attention from hypothermia (although no deaths occurred). The organisers decided to cancel the second day of the event (which turned out to be sunny), and thus ended Japan's first outdoor rock festival. The organizers were criticized for being poorly prepared for bad weather, and for not organising enough buses to link the site to the nearest train station.

The second year, the festival moved to a temporary location in Toyosu, on Tokyo's waterfront. Although the event was a success, many found the searing heat of mid-summer Tokyo too much to bear, and it was decided that the next event was to return to the relative coolness of the mountains.

It was in 1999 the festival found its home in Naeba, Niigata prefecture. Naeba is not anywhere close to Mt. Fuji, however, the festival still retains its original name. After the horrific first year, the organizers have been running the festival smoothly up until present.

2023 
The festival will be hold from July 28 until 30. The headline acts will be The Strokes (Friday), Foo Fighters (Saturday) and Lizzo (Sunday). Other major acts will include Alanis Morissette, Lewis Capaldi, Weezer, Louis Cole, NxWorries, Denzel Curry, Yeah Yeah Yeahs, Yo La Tengo, Slowdive, Cory Wong and more.

2022 
The festival was held from July 29 until 31, and saw the return of international artists. The headline acts were Vampire Weekend, Jack White and Halsey.

Other major acts include: Syd, Arlo Parks, Mogwai, Elephant Gym, Black Pumas, Awich, Dawes and Fontaines D.C.

2021 
The festival was announced to be held from August 20 until 22 and the for the first time, the festival only included domestic artists due to the COVID-19 pandemic. The headline acts were Radwimps, King Gnu and Denki Groove.

Other major acts include: The Bawdies, Indigo la End, Chai, Yoshinori Sunahara, Aoi Teshima, Char, and Ichiko Aoba.

2020 
The festival was scheduled for Friday 21 August through Sunday 23 August 2020, with headline acts to include Tame Impala (Friday), The Strokes (Saturday), Kiyoshiro Imawano Rock 'n' Forever tribute and Denki Groove (both Sunday). On 5 June 2020, this iteration of the festival was postponed to August 2021 due to the COVID-19 pandemic. Instead, the 2020 Fuji Rock Festival was put together from past performances and broadcast live on YouTube on the original scheduled dates.

2019 
The festival ran from Friday 26 July until Sunday 28 July in 2019. Headline performers on The Green Stage were The Chemical Brothers, Sia, and The Cure. About 36 percent of the acts were in the rock genre, while the rest of the lineup was composed of pop, R&B, hip hop, and electronic artists.

Other major acts include: Mitski, Toro y Moi, Kaytranada, The Lumineers, The Waterboys, Daniel Caesar, Alvvays, Ego-Wrappin', George Porter Jr., Chon, The Comet Is Coming, and Khruangbin.

2018 
The festival ran from Friday 27 July until Sunday 29 July in 2018. Headline acts on The Green Stage were N.E.R.D, Kendrick Lamar, and Bob Dylan. Cumulative attendance reached 125,000 for the third year in a row, with a peak of 40,000 visitors on Saturday,

Other major acts include: Mac DeMarco, Tune-Yards, Jon Hopkins, Hanaregumi, MGMT, Princess Nokia, The Avalanches (DJ Set), Nathaniel Rateliff & the Night Sweats, Dirty Projectors, Hothouse Flowers, and Greensky Bluegrass.

2017 
The festival ran from Friday 28 July until Sunday 30 July in 2017. Headline acts on The Green Stage were Gorillaz, Aphex Twin and Björk. Attendance was estimated to equal the previous year's 125,000 guests, with approximately ¥2.1 billion ($19 million) in ticket sales revenue.

Other major acts include: Sampha, Rhye, Father John Misty, Temples, Quruli, The Strypes, Slowdive, and Thundercat.

2016 
The festival ran from Friday 22 July until Sunday 24 July in 2016. Headline acts on The Green Stage were Sigur Rós, Beck and Red Hot Chili Peppers. Attendance for the "20th anniversary" festival was around 125,000 for the weekend.

Other major acts include: The Birthday, The New Mastersounds, Kula Shaker, Special Others, Years & Years, and Kamasi Washington.

2015 
The festival ran from Friday 24 July until Sunday 26 July in 2015. Headline acts on The Green Stage were Foo Fighters, Muse and Noel Gallagher's High Flying Birds. Attendance was 115,000 visitors for the weekend, a dramatic increase over the ten-year-low of the 2014 festival.

Other major acts include: Mannish Boys, Flume, Tamio Okuda, Happy Mondays, Galactic feat. Macy Gray, Of Monsters and Men, and Wilko Johnson.

2014 
The festival ran from Friday 25 July until Sunday 27 July in 2014. Headline acts on The Green Stage were Franz Ferdinand, Arcade Fire and Jack Johnson. Kanye West was initially announced as Friday's headliner but later cancelled "due to artist circumstances". In total, 102,000 people attended.

Other major acts include: The Birthday, Bombay Bicycle Club, Temples, Slowdive, Parquet Courts, moe., Yoko Ono Plastic Ono Band, St. Vincent, Phil Lesh & the Terrapin Family Band, The Lumineers, Lorde, SBTRKT, Buffalo Daughter, and Tokyo Ska Paradise Orchestra.

2013 
The festival ran from Friday 26 July until Sunday 28 July in 2013. Headline acts on The Green Stage were Nine Inch Nails, Björk and The Cure. Attendance was 118,000 people for the weekend.

Other major acts include: Tame Impala, Porter Robinson, Death Grips, DJ Shadow, Tower of Power, Sparks, The Sea and Cake, Boys Noize, Garth Hudson, Ego-Wrappin' and the Gossip of Jaxx, Tahiti 80, Daughter, Jamie xx, Lettuce, and the David Murray Big Band feat. Macy Gray.

2012 
The festival ran from Friday 27 July until Sunday 29 July in 2012. Headline acts on The Green Stage were The Stone Roses, Noel Gallagher's High Flying Birds and Radiohead. As of 2017, 2012 holds the record for highest-ever Fuji Rock attendance, with a total of 140,000 visitors over the three days.

Other major acts include: Ocean Colour Scene, The Kooks, Spiritualized, Purity Ring, Steve Kimock, The Shins, James Iha, alt-J, Japandroids, Ray Davies & Band, Che Sudaka and jizue.

2011 
The festival ran from Friday 29 July until Sunday 31 July 2011. Headline acts on The Green Stage were Coldplay, The Faces and The Chemical Brothers; The Music closed the festival out as special guests.

Other major acts include: The Sisters of Mercy, Four Tet, Jamie xx, Widespread Panic, Amadou & Mariam, Digitalism, Todd Rundgren, Atari Teenage Riot, Envy, Beach House, Quruli, and Dark Star Orchestra. Queens of the Stone Age and Tangerine Dream were both scheduled to appear, but cancelled two months before the festival.

2010 
The festival ran from Friday 30 July until Sunday 1 August 2010. Headline acts on The Green Stage were Muse, Roxy Music and Massive Attack; Scissor Sisters closed the festival out as special guests.

Other major acts include: Broken Social Scene, The xx, Broken Bells, Char, Magma, Dirty Projectors, Flogging Molly, Fishbone, the Derek Trucks & Susan Tedeschi Band, Ego-Wrappin' and the Gossip of Jaxx, Air, Hot Chip, Buffalo Daughter, moe., Ozomatli, and the Naruyoshi Kikuchi Dub Sextet.

2009 
The festival ran from Friday 24 July until Sunday 26 July in 2009. Headline acts on The Green Stage were Oasis, Franz Ferdinand and Weezer.

Other major acts include: Simian Mobile Disco, M83, Diplo, Clammbon, Tortoise, System 7, Dinosaur Jr., Bright Eyes, The Funky Meters, Booker T. Jones, Maxïmo Park, and the Disco Biscuits.

2008 
In 2008, the festival ran from Friday, 25 July through until Sunday, 27 July. Headline acts on The Green Stage were My Bloody Valentine, Underworld, and Primal Scream. Kiyoshiro Imawano was initially announced as Sunday's headliner, but due to a recurrence of his throat cancer, he was forced to cancel his appearance. Primal Scream and The Birthday, subheadliners from Saturday, added Sunday performances to compensate.

Other artists included: Feeder, The Vines, Gossip, Spoon, The Whigs, Dan le Sac Vs Scroobius Pip, Grandmaster Flash, The New Mastersounds, Special Others, Uri Nakayama, Sherbets, Ozomatli, Hocus Pocus, Doberman, Denki Groove, Ian Brown, Tricky, Princess Superstar, Erol Alkan, Richie Hawtin, Lettuce, Flower Travellin' Band, Bettye LaVette, Sparks, CSS, The Go! Team, Foals, White Lies, The Death Set, Neon Neon, Adrian Sherwood, Lee "Scratch" Perry, Michael Franti and Spearhead, Seasick Steve, and Bill Laswell presents Method of Defiance.

2007 
The 2007 festival ran from Friday, 27 July through Sunday, 29 July. Headline acts on The Green Stage were The Cure, Beastie Boys, and The Chemical Brothers.

Other artists included: Fountains of Wayne, Ocean Colour Scene, Blonde Redhead, Ratatat, Yo La Tengo, Pe'z, Kenichi Asai, G. Love & Special Sauce, Lily Allen, Shonen Knife, The Bird and the Bee, Simian Mobile Disco, Justice, Gov't Mule, Grace Potter and the Nocturnals, Feist, Clap Your Hands Say Yeah, Friction, Peter Bjorn and John, The Wombats, Chromeo, Soul Flower Union, Jonathan Richman, and Jake Shimabukuro. Ticket prices for the 2007 festival remained unchanged from the 2006 event.

2006 
The 2006 festival ran from Friday, 28 July until Sunday, 30 July (actually Monday morning). Headline acts on The Green Stage were Franz Ferdinand, Red Hot Chili Peppers, and The Strokes.

Other artists included: The Zutons, Roger Joseph Manning, Jr., The Cribs, Atmosphere, Shang Shang Typhoon, North Mississippi Allstars, Blackalicious, Haruomi Hosono, Kula Shaker, Junior Senior, 2manydjs, Tristan Prettyman, Shinya Ohe, Killing Joke, The Automatic, Milburn, Nightmares on Wax, Digitalism, and Umphrey's McGee. Early bird advance tickets for the entire festival cost ￥32,000, while one-day tickets were ￥16,800; however, only 10,000 single-day tickets were made available for each day. Tickets for the on-site campsite cost ￥2,500 per person, and parking was available at a cost of ￥2,000/day but only permitted for cars carrying two or more festival-goers.

2005 
The 2005 festival ran from the weekend of 29 – 31 July 2005. Headline acts on The Green Stage were Foo Fighters, Fatboy Slim, and New Order.

Other artists included: Rosso, Charlotte Hatherley, Kaiser Chiefs, The Longcut, Night Snipers, Crown City Rockers, Rovo, Pe'z, The Beautiful Girls, Crazy Ken Band, Lisa Loeb, Eddi Reader, Mercury Rev, Clammbon, The Bravery, Bill Laswell, Laurent Garnier United State of Electronica, Ryan Adams & The Cardinals, My Morning Jacket, The Coral, Röyksopp, The Futureheads, Aqualung, The Magic Numbers, Mylo, Soulive, and The John Butler Trio.

2004 
In 2004, the festival ran from Friday 30 July until Sunday 1 August. Headline acts on The Green Stage were Lou Reed, The Chemical Brothers, and The White Stripes. Morrissey was initially announced as Sunday's headliner but cancelled two weeks before the festival due to "a sudden disagreement [...] regarding the terms of the performance".

Other artists included: Supercar, The Zutons, Asian Kung-Fu Generation, Snow Patrol, The Killers, Sikth, Zero 7, Dizzee Rascal, DJ Krush, Chris Robinson & New Earth Mud, Buckethead’s Giant Robot, Hifana, The Charlatans, Yeah Yeah Yeahs, Ben Kweller, The Streets, Santos, Buffalo Daughter, Jack Johnson, Donavon Frankenreiter, The Blind Boys of Alabama, Ash, Keane, The Stills, Sambomaster, Simple Kid, The Black Keys, Stevie Salas, Keller Williams, and moe.

2003 
In 2003, the festival ran from Friday 25 July until Sunday 27 July. Headline acts on The Green Stage were Underworld, Björk, and Elvis Costello.

Other major acts include: Audio Active, Death in Vegas, El-P/Aesop Rock/DJ Big Wiz, Prefuse 73, Bob Weir and RatDog, G. Love & Special Sauce, John Mayall & the Bluesbreakers, The Coral, Goldfrapp, Röyksopp, Boom Boom Satellites, The Jeevas, Ego-Wrappin', The Thrills, Jet, Dirty Vegas, Steve Kimock Band, and The Sun Ra Arkestra.

2002 
In 2002, the festival ran from Friday 26 July until Sunday 28 July. Headline acts on The Green Stage were The Prodigy, The Chemical Brothers, and Red Hot Chili Peppers.

Other major acts include: Black Rebel Motorcycle Club, Television, X-Press 2, Patti Smith, The White Stripes, Billy Bragg and The Blokes, Buffalo Daughter, The Music, Hundred Reasons, Shonen Knife, The Cinematic Orchestra, DJ Shadow, Tha Blue Herb, The String Cheese Incident, Ian Brown, Doves, and Galactic.

2001 
The festival ran from Friday 27 July until Sunday 29 July in 2001. Headline acts on The Green Stage were Oasis, Neil Young & Crazy Horse, and Eminem.

Other major acts include: Husking Bee, Semisonic, Feeder, Stereo MCs, Unkle, Juno Reactor, V∞redoms, Echo & the Bunnymen, Powderfinger, The Cooper Temple Clause, Kemuri, Ani DiFranco, UA, and Tegan and Sara.

2000 
In 2000, the festival ran from Friday 28 July until Sunday 30 July. Headline acts on The Green Stage were Blankey Jet City (their final live performance), Thee Michelle Gun Elephant, and Primal Scream.

Other major acts include: Grapevine, Eagle-Eye Cherry, G. Love & Special Sauce, OOIOO, Mogwai, Yura Yura Teikoku, Yo La Tengo, Richard D. James & DJ Grant, Super Furry Animals, Gomez, Rammstein, Jess Klein, and Kinocosmo.

1999 
In 1999, the festival ran from Friday 30 July until Sunday 1 August. Headline acts on The Green Stage were Rage Against the Machine, Blur, and ZZ Top. This was the first year that the festival was held in its present location at Naeba Ski Resort in Niigata Prefecture, as well as the first year that it expanded from a two-day to three-day festival.

Other major acts include Mix Master Mike, Prince Paul & Automator, Boom Boom Satellites, The Orb, DJ Spooky, That Subliminal Kid, Quruli, Jungle Brothers, and Mad Professor. Phish headlined the Field of Heaven stage all three days, and their complete performance from Jul 31, 1999 was officially released as Japan Relief in March 2011.

1998 
In 1998, the festival was held at Tokyo Bayside Square in Toyosu and ran from Saturday 1 August until Sunday 2 August. Headline acts on The Green Stage were Björk and The Prodigy.

1997 
1997 was the only year that the festival was actually held on Mount Fuji, at the Fuji Tenjinyama Ski Resort. It was intended to run from Saturday 26 July until Sunday 27 July, although the second day was cancelled due to a typhoon. Headline acts on the Main Stage were Red Hot Chili Peppers and Green Day.

See also
 
List of historic rock festivals

References

External links 

 Official site (Japanese)
 Official site (English)

Music festivals in Japan
Rock festivals in Japan
1997 establishments in Japan
Tourist attractions in Niigata Prefecture
Music festivals established in 1997
Yuzawa, Niigata